Kasur is a city in Pakistan.

Kasur may also refer to:
Kasur District, a district of Punjab (Pakistan).
Kasur Tehsil, a tehsil of district Kasur.
Kasur station:
Kasur Junction railway station, a railway station situated in Kasur region.
Kasur Tehsil railway station, a railway station in Kasur tehsil.

See also
Kasuri (disambiguation)
Kasoor, 2001 Indian film directed by Vikram Bhatt